Nakatani (written: 中谷 or 仲谷) is a Japanese surname. Notable people with the surname include:

Carlos Nakatani (1934–2004), Mexican artist
Corey Nakatani (born 1970), American jockey
, Japanese politician
, Japanese baseball player
Junto Nakatani (中谷潤人, born 2 January 1998), Japanese boxer
Masayoshi Nakatani (中谷正義, born 18 August 1998), Japanese boxer
, Japanese musician
, Japanese actress and singer
, Japanese manga artist
, Japanese footballer
, Japanese judoka
, Japanese politician
, Japanese footballer

See Also 

 Nakaya, other Japanese surnames using the same kanji 中谷 or 仲谷.

Japanese-language surnames